Apachita (Aymara: the place of transit of an important pass in the principal routes of the Andes via a stone cairn(a little pile of rocks built along the trail in the high mountains); also spelled Apacheta) is a  mountain in the Bolivian Andes. It is located in the Potosí Department, Chayanta Province, Ravelo Municipality. It lies northeast of the village of Wari Pampa (Huari Pampa).

References 

Mountains of Potosí Department